Kupalny is a rural locality (a settlement) in Nizhnekamenskoye Rural Settlement, Talovsky District, Voronezh Oblast, Russia. The population was 94 as of 2010.

Geography 
It is located 10 km southeast from Talovaya.

References 

Rural localities in Talovsky District